Lauren Christine German is an American actress. She had her first major role in the 2002 teen romantic drama film A Walk to Remember, followed by roles in the horror films The Texas Chainsaw Massacre (2003) and Hostel: Part II (2007). From 2011 to 2012, German had a main role as DHS agent Lori Weston in the second season of the CBS police drama Hawaii Five-0, and from 2012 to 2015, she starred as Leslie Shay in the NBC drama Chicago Fire. From 2016-2021, she appeared as detective Chloe Decker in the American fantasy comedy-drama Lucifer.

Early life
German was born in the Orange County suburb of Huntington Beach, California Her father Richard German is a vascular surgeon. Her paternal grandfather, James German, was Dutch; born in Amsterdam in 1909. He immigrated with his family to the United States from the Netherlands when he was a child. The remainder of Lauren's ancestry is English. She attended Los Alamitos High School and Orange County High School of the Arts and then enrolled at the University of Southern California, where she studied anthropology.

Career

2000–2010
German's first work was on stage in Peter Pan and Oliver. She made her feature film debut in the 2000 romantic comedy Down to You, where she had a small role as a lovestruck woman. German appeared in a pictorial for Maxim magazine's January 2002 issue and was placed as #47 in Maxim's "Hot 100 of 2002" list.

In 2002, German co-starred in the romantic drama A Walk to Remember with Shane West and Mandy Moore, based on Nicholas Sparks' 1999 novel of the same name. She played Belinda, a popular but mean-spirited high school girl who harbors unrequited love for Landon Carter (West). She then appeared in the crime/horror film Dead Above Ground, the drama A Midsummer Night's Rave, and the TV movie The Lone Ranger. In 2003, she auditioned to star in the remake of the classic 1974 horror film The Texas Chainsaw Massacre, but the role went to Jessica Biel, and German won the role of the hitchhiker.

German co-starred in the crime drama Born Killers (2005), the thriller Rx (2005), the romantic comedy Standing Still (2005), and the drama It Is Fine! Everything Is Fine. (2007). She also starred in the musical drama What We Do Is Secret with Shane West again, based on a true story. West played original Germs singer and German played The Go-Go's singer Belinda Carlisle.

2011–2015
She starred in the horror film Hostel: Part II. and the French apocalypse thriller The Divide.  She starred in the second season of the CBS police drama Hawaii Five-0 as DHS agent Lori Weston from 2011 to 2012. From 2012 to 2014, she starred as paramedic Leslie Shay in the NBC drama Chicago Fire. When her character was killed, her character's name was printed on the door of the ambulance in which she rode, as a memorial. She graced the cover of TV Guide magazine with her Chicago Fire co-stars on November 18, 2013.

2016–2021
In 2015, German was added to the main cast of the Fox fantasy comedy-drama Lucifer, playing Detective Chloe Decker. She portrayed the leading female role of an LAPD homicide detective who finds herself both repulsed and fascinated by Tom Ellis's character, Lucifer Morningstar, who was tired of his "job" as the Lord of Hell and has relocated to Los Angeles.  The series ended in 2021.

Filmography

References

External links

 

21st-century American actresses
American film actresses
American television actresses
Actresses from California
Actresses from Orange County, California
Living people
American people of English descent
American people of Dutch descent
Orange County School of the Arts alumni
University of Southern California alumni
Year of birth missing (living people)